Dolecta invenusta is a moth in the family Cossidae. It is found in Brazil.

References

Cossidae